Adam John Alexy (born April 21, 1998) is an American professional baseball pitcher for the Chicago White Sox of Major League Baseball (MLB). He has previously played in MLB for the Texas Rangers.

Amateur career
Alexy attended Twin Valley High School in Elverson, Pennsylvania. He committed to play college baseball at Radford University. During his senior season at Twin Valley, Alexy went 9 innings in which he threw 164 pitches, leading his team to a 2–1 win. Alexy was drafted by the Los Angeles Dodgers in the 11th round of the 2016 MLB draft, and signed with them for a $600,000 signing bonus, forgoing his commitment to Radford.

Professional career

Los Angeles Dodgers
After signing, Alexy was assigned to the Arizona League Dodgers to make his professional debut; in  innings pitched for them, he posted a 1–0 record and a 4.61 ERA. He began the 2017 season with the Great Lakes Loons.

Texas Rangers
On July 31, 2017, the Dodgers traded Alexy, along with Willie Calhoun and Brendon Davis, to the Texas Rangers in exchange for Yu Darvish. The Rangers assigned him to the Hickory Crawdads, where he finished the season. In 19 starts for Great Lakes he was 2–6 with a 3.97 ERA, striking out 86 in  innings, and in five starts for Hickory he was 1–1 with a 3.05 ERA. He spent 2018 with Hickory, going 6–8 with a 3.58 ERA and 138 strikeouts over 108 innings. Alexy was assigned to the Down East Wood Ducks of the Class A-Advanced Carolina League for the 2019 season, going 0–3 with a 5.12 ERA in  innings. He suffered a strained Latissimus dorsi muscle in his back during a game on May 1 and received a PRP injection as part of his rehab process. Alexy missed the rest of the 2019 season due to the lat injury. Following the 2019 season, Alexy played for the Surprise Saguaros of the Arizona Fall League. Alexy did not play in a game in 2020 due to the cancellation of the Minor League Baseball season because of the COVID-19 pandemic.

On November 20, 2020, Alexy was added to the Rangers 40-man roster. Alexy opened the 2021 season with the Frisco RoughRiders of the Double-A Central league. After going 3–1 with a 1.61 ERA and 57 strikeouts over  innings for Frisco, he was promoted to the Round Rock Express of the Triple-A West on August 3. 

On August 30, 2021, Alexy was promoted to the active roster to make his MLB debut that night versus the Colorado Rockies. In his debut, he recorded the win while throwing five scoreless innings with four strikeouts. Over five games for Texas in 2021, Alexy posted a 3–1 record with a 4.70 ERA and 17 strikeouts over 23 innings. With Round Rock in 2022, he went 6–6 with a 5.91 ERA over 96 innings. With Texas, he went 1–1 with a 11.57 ERA over 7 innings.

The Rangers designated Alexy for assignment after the 2022 season.

Chicago White Sox
On December 13, 2022, Alexy was claimed off waivers by the Washington Nationals. Alexy was designated for assignment on January 4, 2023, after the signing of Dominic Smith was made official.

On January 10, 2023, Alexy was traded to the Minnesota Twins in exchange for minor league right-hander Cristian Jimenez. On January 23, Alexy was designated for assignment by Minnesota following the acquisition of Michael A. Taylor.

On January 30, 2023, Alexy was claimed off waivers by the Chicago White Sox.

References

External links

1998 births
Living people
People from Honey Brook, Pennsylvania
Baseball players from Pennsylvania
Major League Baseball pitchers
Texas Rangers players
Arizona League Dodgers players
Great Lakes Loons players
Hickory Crawdads players
Down East Wood Ducks players
Surprise Saguaros players
Frisco RoughRiders players
Round Rock Express players